Marv Studios (commonly known as Marv and stylised as MARV, and formerly SKA Films) is a British-American production company owned by Matthew Vaughn. It is best known for the motion pictures Layer Cake, Stardust, Kick-Ass, Kingsman: The Secret Service, Kingsman: The Golden Circle and The King's Man.

History

SKA Films 
In 1997, producer Matthew Vaughn and director Guy Ritchie launched their own company in the United Kingdom, with its first project being Lock, Stock and Two Smoking Barrels, which is for Handmade Films.

In 1999, Vaughn and Ritchie struck an agreement with Sony Pictures to distribute its next project, Snatch.

The team followed it up with their next big project Swept Away, starring Madonna. The film ended up being bombed critically and commercially. It went on to win the Golden Raspberry Awards in 2003.

Marv Films / Marv Studios 
Later that same year, Ritchie and Vaughn broke up ties, thus rebranding from SKA Films to Marv Films, and its first production under the new banner was Matthew Vaughn's directorial debut Layer Cake.

In 2007, it signed a deal with Sony Pictures Entertainment to produce its feature films. Later that same year, Charlie Mitchell joined the company.

In 2009, Kris Thykier decided to leave Marv Films, in order to set up PeaPie Films, to produce new feature films.

In 2018, Vaughn launched its subsidiary Marv Studios to set up new feature film reboots.

Marv Music 

In 2021, Marv launched a record label, Marv Music, in conjunction with Warner Music Group. The label is distributed under Warner's Parlophone unit.

Films

Television

References

External links 
 Official website

Marv Studios films
Film production companies of the United Kingdom
British companies established in 1997
Entertainment companies established in 1997